Arvid Thorberg (born 1877, Kärrbo, d. 1930) was a Swedish trade union organizer. By profession he was a carpenter, and belonged to the Swedish Wood Workers' Union. He was the chairman of the Swedish Trade Union Confederation from 1920-1930.

References

Swedish trade unionists
1877 births
1930 deaths
Members of the Första kammaren